The Kim Sisters were a Korean-born American female singing group who made their career in the United States during the 1950s and 1960s. They are known for being the first South Korean music group to achieve success in the U.S. market, and for performing more than 20 times on The Ed Sullivan Show. The group consisted of Sue, Aija and Mia.

Early lives
Sue and Aija's parents were Kim Hae-song, a popular conductor, and Lee Nan-young, one of Korea's most famous singers before the Korean War, best known for her song, "Tears of Mokpo." Mia's father was Lee Bong-ryong, a musician and Lee Nan-young's elder brother.

In 1950, North Korea captured and later executed Kim Hae-song, the father of Sue and Aija.

Career

Beginnings 
Following her husband's kidnapping, Lee Nan-young adopted Mia and had her daughters form a singing group in order to support the family.  Lee bought American records on the black market so that the girls could learn songs like Hoagy Carmichael's "Ole Buttermilk Sky," which they performed in bars and nightclubs for American soldiers stationed in South Korea during the Korean War.

The Kim Sisters were popular among the American troops, who spread the word about the group to American entertainment producer Tom Ball. He flew to South Korea in 1958 to hear the group perform, and The Kim Sisters signed a contract with Ball soon after. However, it took them nearly a year to acquire visas to go to the United States.

Fame in the United States 
In 1959, The Kim Sisters arrived in Las Vegas to perform in Ball's "China Doll Revue" at the Thunderbird Hotel. After they fulfilled their contract at the Thunderbird, The Kim Sisters began performing at the Stardust Hotel. It was during this time that they were first invited to perform on The Ed Sullivan Show. They ultimately performed on the show an additional 21 times. They made a guest appearance on the Dean Jones Ensign O'Toole sitcom, "Operation Benefit" October 14, 1962. The Kim Sisters frequently performed wearing Korean hanbok and singing popular American songs.

In 1962, their cover of The Coasters song "Charlie Brown" reached #7 on the Billboard singles chart, making The Kim Sisters the first commercially successful Korean artists in the United States.

Aija died of lung cancer in 1987. Mia lives in Hungary with her husband, famous musician Tommy Vig, and still performs in America, Europe and Korea.

On March 27, 2014, Sue Kim became the first Korean American to be inducted into the Nevada Entertainer/Artist Hall of Fame.

Discography

Studio albums

U.S. singles

See also
Korean Kittens

References

External links

 Kim Sisters live performance (1957)
 The Story of Mia Kim and the Kim Sisters

Musical groups established in 1953
Sibling musical trios
South Korean girl groups
American girl groups
Monument Records artists
American people of Korean descent
American singers of Asian descent